Ayeisha McFerran (born 10 January 1996) is an Ireland women's field hockey international. She was a member of the Ireland team that played in the 2018 Women's Hockey World Cup final. She was also named Goalkeeper of the Tournament. McFerran was also a member of the Pegasus team that won the 2014–15 Women's Irish Hockey League. Between 2015 and 2017 she was named three times as an NFHCA All-American while playing for Louisville Cardinals.

Early years, family and education
McFerran is originally from Larne. She is the daughter of George and Sandra McFerran. She has three siblings, Tamara, Reece and Shea. Her mother died when McFerran was 15. She was educated at Larne Grammar School and at the University of Louisville. In addition to playing field hockey, in her youth McFerran was an Irish dancer and played the flute.

Domestic teams

Larne Grammar School
After taking up field hockey at age 7, McFerran began representing Larne Grammar School as a Year 8 pupil in 2008. McFerran was still a pupil at Larne Grammar School when she made her senior debut for Ireland.

Randalstown
In addition to playing for Larne Grammar School, McFerran also played club field hockey with her PE teacher, Emma Knox, at Randalstown. McFerran was a Randalstown player when she made her senior debut for Ireland.

Pegasus
McFerran joined Pegasus in September 2014 after a proposed plan to play for UCD fell through. She was subsequently a member of the Pegasus team that won the 2014–15 Women's Irish Hockey League title. She was also named as the league's best goalkeeper.

Louisville Cardinals
In 2015 McFerran began a field hockey scholarship at the University of Louisville. Between 2015 and 2017 she was named three times as an NFHCA All-American while playing for Louisville Cardinals. While based in Louisville, Kentucky, McFerran also worked as a goalkeeper coach at a local field hockey club, IFHCK.

Kampong
In August 2019, McFerran joined Dutch Hoofdklasse club SV Kampong.

Ireland international
McFerran made her senior debut for Ireland against Spain on 11 January 2014, the day after her 18th birthday. In March 2015 McFerran was a member of the Ireland team that won a 2014–15 Women's FIH Hockey World League Round 2 tournament hosted in Dublin, defeating Canada in the final after a penalty shoot-out. McFerran, regarded as a shoot-out specialist, replaced Emma Gray specifically for the shoot-out and subsequently saved three penalties. She was also a member of the Ireland team that won the 2015 Women's EuroHockey Championship II, defeating the Czech Republic 5–0 in the final. In January 2017 she was also a member of the Ireland team that won a 2016–17 Women's FIH Hockey World League Round 2 tournament in Kuala Lumpur, defeating Malaysia 3–0 in the final.

McFerran represented Ireland at the 2018 Women's Hockey World Cup and was a prominent member of the team that won the silver medal. She featured in all of Ireland's games throughout the tournament, including the pool games against the United States, India, and England, the quarter-final against India, the semi-final against Spain  and the final against the Netherlands. Both the quarter-final against India  and the semi-final against Spain  were decided by penalty shoot-out and McFerran was instrumental in Ireland reaching the final. She saved three penalties against India and four against Spain. On the way to the final she conceded just three goals in five matches and she was subsequently named Goalkeeper of the Tournament.

Honours
Ireland
Women's Hockey World Cup
Runners Up: 2018
Women's FIH Hockey World League
Winners: 2015 Dublin, 2017 Kuala Lumpur
Women's EuroHockey Championship II
Winners: 2015
Women's Hockey Champions Challenge I
Runners Up: 2014
Women's FIH Hockey Series
Runners Up: 2019 Banbridge
Women's Four Nations Cup
Runners Up: 2017
Pegasus
Women's Irish Hockey League
Winners: 2014–15
Individual
NFHCA All-American
Winner: 2015, 2016, 2017, 2018
Goalkeeper of the Tournament
Winner: 2018 Women's Hockey World Cup

References

External links
 
 Ayeisha McFerran at Hockey Ireland
 
 

1996 births
Living people
Ireland international women's field hockey players
Female field hockey players from Northern Ireland
Irish female field hockey players
British female field hockey players
Women's Irish Hockey League players
Expatriate field hockey players
Expatriate sportspeople from Northern Ireland in the United States
Female field hockey goalkeepers
Louisville Cardinals field hockey players
SV Kampong players
University of Louisville alumni
People educated at Larne Grammar School
Sportspeople from County Antrim
Expatriate sportspeople from Northern Ireland in the Netherlands
Field hockey players at the 2020 Summer Olympics
Olympic field hockey players of Ireland